Gregory Stewart (born July 13, 1986) is a Canadian para-athlete who specializes in shot put. He represented Canada at the 2020 Summer Paralympics.

Career
Stewart represented Canada at the 2019 Parapan American Games where he overcame a back injury and won a silver medal in the shot put F46 event with a Canadian record of 16.30-metres. He also represented Canada at the 2019 World Para Athletics Championships and won a silver medal in the shot put F46 event.

Stewart represented Canada at the 2020 Summer Paralympics in the shot put F46 event and won a gold medal with a Paralympic Games record of 16.75-metres.

Personal life
Stewart was born without the lower part of his left arm.

References

External links
 
 

1986 births
Living people
Athletes from Victoria, British Columbia
Medalists at the World Para Athletics Championships
Medalists at the 2019 Parapan American Games
Athletes (track and field) at the 2020 Summer Paralympics
Medalists at the 2020 Summer Paralympics
Paralympic gold medalists for Canada
Paralympic medalists in athletics (track and field)
Canadian male shot putters
20th-century Canadian people
21st-century Canadian people